Lisa Maxwell is a singer-songwriter who began her career doing backing vocals for acts such as Kate Ceberano, and Wendy Matthews as well as working in the Australian dance music scene, featuring on albums by Ground Level, Severed Heads and Boxcar. She later signed with Sony/ATV Music Publishing... and released her first EP "Stand My Ground" followed by the release of her first album Wish through Sony Music sub label Dance Pool

Early career 1989–1996 

Maxwell started her career working with Kate Ceberano and recorded backing vocals on the Kate Ceberano album Think About It!

She also featured on Ground Level's track Journey Through the Night. She became a backup singer for Wendy Matthews and later signed a deal with Sony/ATV Music Publishing and released her first independent record in 1993 through MDS (Mushroom Distribution Services) titled Stand My Ground. She also featured on Severed Heads track "Heart of The Party" from their album Gigapus and Boxcar album Algorhythm.

In 1994 Maxwell was a Sony Music featured artist at Midem, a music industry event held in Cannes and at the time administered by Export Music Australia (EMA).

Wish album 1997–1999 

Maxwell released her original album Wish through Sony Music's sub label Dance Pool. The album has tracks that Australian dance producers Pee Wee Ferris and Groove Terminator worked on. Two tracks from the album, covers of Sister Sledge song "Thinking of You" and George McCrae song "Rock Your Baby" both appeared in Tokyo's J-WAVE radio charts. "Thinking of you" at number 8 and "Rock Your Baby" number 15. "Thinking of you" also charted in New Zealand reaching number 50 on the Official New Zealand Music Chart. She also released a third single off the album "Falling Back To You" which was featured on an episode of Australian television soap opera Neighbours. Maxwell's original track "I've Learned to Cope", which she recorded with Bass Culture for their BC Nation album also appeared on her album Wish and featured on the Australian film The Sum of Us starring Jack Thompson and Russell Crowe

Discography

Albums/EPs
 Stand My Ground (1993)
 Wish (1998)
 Let It Rain (2017)

Singles
 'Thinking of You' (1996)
 'Rock Your Baby' (1997)
 'Falling Back To You' (1998)

References 

Australian dance musicians
Singers from Melbourne
Singers from Sydney
Year of birth missing (living people)
Living people
20th-century Australian women singers
21st-century Australian women singers